St. Augustine's Day School was established in Kolkata, India, in 1971 by Mr. C.R Gasper and Mrs. Edna Gasper under the St. Augustine Education Society. Presently the school operates under a different Society and has one branch affiliated to ISC Council (Kolkata) and three feeder branches:
 Kolkata
 Uluberia
 Sarat Bose Road
 Budge Budge
The original St. Augustine Education Society operates St. Augustine’s Day School Barrackpore and St. Augustine’s Day School Shyamnagar both affiliated to the ISC Council with a branch in Manirampur. The Barrackpore School has featured in the Top 10 schools in North Kolkata in the Times of India study 2018. In 2019 the school has ranked 3rd All India in the ICSE exam.

Co-curricular activities 
 Quiz Club
 Social Service
 Scouts
 Physical Training
 Debate Club
 Western Music
 LTS
 Music Club
 Nature Club
 Mentle club

External links
 Official Website

Schools in Kolkata
Educational institutions established in 1971
1971 establishments in West Bengal